Douglas Long (May 24, 1955 – January 21, 2012) was an American football defensive back in the National Football League (NFL) who played for the Seattle Seahawks. He played college football at Whitworth University.

References 

1955 births
2012 deaths
Whitworth Pirates football players
Seattle Seahawks players